Nizhny Lomov is a town and the administrative center of Nizhnelomovsky District in Penza Oblast, Russia, located on the Lomov River (Oka's basin), on the M5 Highway  northwest of Penza, the administrative center of the oblast. Population:

History
It was founded as an outpost in 1636 as part of the Belgorod Line defense system. It was later known as Lomovskaya sloboda, Lomovsky posad, and the village of Nizhny Lomov. Town status was granted to it in 1780.

Administrative and municipal status
Within the framework of administrative divisions, Nizhny Lomov serves as the administrative center of Nizhnelomovsky District. As an administrative division, it is incorporated within Nizhnelomovsky District as the town of district significance of Nizhny Lomov. As a municipal division, the town of district significance of Nizhny Lomov is incorporated within Nizhnelomovsky Municipal District as Nizhny Lomov Urban Settlement.

References

Notes

Sources

Cities and towns in Penza Oblast
Populated places established in 1636
1636 establishments in Russia
Nizhnelomovsky Uyezd
Nizhnelomovsky District